Glafira Ivanovna Alymova (1758–1826) was a Russian Empire lady in waiting and harpist.

Biography 
Glafira Alymova was the daughter of Colonel Ivan Akinfievich Alymov. She studied at the Smolny Institute from 1764 to 1776, as one of its first students, and excelled in music. On her graduation in 1776, she was decorated as one of its five best students, and was made lady in waiting to the Empress Catherine the Great. The Empress was fond of her because of her good humor and temperament. She was married successively to the writer and nobleman Alexei Rzhevskii in 1777, as his second wife, and in 1805 to the translator Maskle. Her second marriage, to a man twenty years younger than her and of lower social status, was regarded a scandal. 

Mariya Svistunova was her eldest child and only daughter. 

Glafira Alymova was regarded as one of the best harpists of her time. She was awarded the order of St Catherine by Empress Catherine.

Sources 
 Ржевская Г. И. (Алымова) Памятные записки Глафиры Ивановны Ржевской // Русский архив, 1871. — Кн. 1. — Вып. 1. — Стб. 1-52.
 Дмитрий Григорьевич Левицкий 1735—1822: Каталог временной выставки — Государственный русский музей. — Л.: «Искусство», Ленинградское отделение, 1987. — 142 с.
 Казовский, Михаил. Екатерина: мудрость и любовь: историческая повесть. — М.: Подвиг, 2010.

1758 births
18th-century musicians from the Russian Empire
Ladies-in-waiting from the Russian Empire
Harpists
Musicians from the Russian Empire
1826 deaths
18th-century women musicians
19th-century women musicians from the Russian Empire